Glenancross is a settlement on the west coast of Scotland, overlooking the Sound of Sleat south of  Mallaig, Lochaber, in the Scottish Highlands and is in the council area of Highland.

References

Populated places in Lochaber